Ole Jacob Hystad (born 20 July 1960) is a Norwegian jazz musician (tenor saxophone and clarinet). He was born in Stord, and is the brother of jazz saxophonist Jan Kåre Hystad.

Career 
Hystad is leader of his own Ole Jacob Hystad Quartet, originally comprising additional Sigurd Ulveseth (bass), Ben Besiakov, (piano),
and Stein Inge Brækhus (drums).
Later the quartet substituted Brækhus with Alex Riel for their second album Tune in – take out (2002), and has lately consisted of Dag Arnesen (piano), Sigurd Ulveseth (bass) and Frank Jakobsen (drums). He also played in Bakeriet Bluesband, and on releases by the musicians Atle Hansen, Lars Erik Drevvatne and Ole Amund Gjersvik, and been at the forefront of Stord Jazz and Blues Festival.

The Hystad brothers toured US and Canada with Terje Rypdal's Crime Scene as part of Bergen Big Band.

Discography

As band leader 
1998: Touch of time (Taurus Records), as O.J.H. Quartet (Ben Besiakov, Sigurd Ulveseth & Stein Inge Brækhus)
2002: Tune in – take out (Taurus Records), as O.J.H. Quartet (Ben Besiakov, Sigurd Ulveseth & Alex Riel) playing music inspired by Dexter Gordon

Collaborative works 
With Ole Amund Gjersvik
1990: A Voice from the Past (Acoustic Records)
1995: Around the Fountain (Acoustic Records)

With Britt-Synnøve Johansen
2002: Mot Himmlen I Paris – Piaf På Norsk (West Audio Production)

Within Bergen Big Band
2003: Adventures in European New Jazz And Improvised Music (Europe Jazz Oddysey), with Mathias Rüegg "Art & Fun" on compilation with various artists
2005: Seagull (Grappa Music), feat. Karin Krog conducted by John Surman recorded at the Nattjazz Festival, Bergen 2004
2007: Meditations on Coltrane (Grappa Music), with The Core
2008: Som den gyldne sol frembryter (Grappa Music)
2010: Crime Scene (ECM Records), with Terje Rypdal recorded at the Nattjazz Festival, Bergen 2009

With Jan Kåre Hystad
2006: Vargtime 2 – Four Cousins (Gemini Records)

With Christian Welde
2009: Skywatching (WeldeMedia), including Jan Ingvar Toft, Mike McGurk and Roger Pedersen

With Organ Jam
2013: Organics (Normann Records)

References

External links
Ole Jacob Hystad – 28.12.2012 on YouTube

Norwegian jazz saxophonists
Norwegian jazz composers
Male jazz composers
ECM Records artists
Taurus Records artists
1960 births
Living people
Musicians from Stord
21st-century saxophonists
21st-century Norwegian male musicians
Bergen Big Band members